Saint Phanourios (Greek: Άγιος Φανούριος), also known as St. Phanourios the Newly-Manifest (Greek: Άγιος Φανούριος ο Νεοφανής) is recognized as a saint by the Greek Orthodox Church. He is commemorated on August 27.

Saint Phanourios was awarded the Martyr's Crown in the Orthodox Christian faith.

He is also well known for finding people's lost belongings after fervent supplications.

Angelos Akotantos from Crete has painted a number of the Saint's icons many times depicting him killing a dragon; this tradition is found mainly in Crete especially in icons of the 15th century when the Saint is said to have saved many Cretans from certain death from the hands of the invading Ottomans.

The chapel of Saint Phanourios near the village of Ayios Georgios on the north coast of the island of Cyprus is located near fossil bones of pygmy hippopotamuses.
Locals believed them the bones of the saint and would powder them into a healing drink.
The Cypriot dwarf hippopotamus, Hippopotamus minor, was assigned the binomial name Phanourios minutus in 1972.

References

External links 
The life of St. Phanourios

Greek saints of the Eastern Orthodox Church
Rhodes